Birmingham Wildlife Conservation Park, formerly Birmingham Nature Centre, and before that Birmingham Zoo, is a small zoo on the edge of Cannon Hill Park in Birmingham, England. It is owned and managed by Birmingham City Council.

As well as catering to tourists and locals, the zoo is actively involved in many scientific programmes, such as the EEP captive breeding programmes with endangered animals, helping to highlight the plight of the world's biodiversity through educational talks and campaigns.

The zoo is a member of the British and Irish Association of Zoos and Aquariums (BIAZA) and the European Association of Zoos and Aquaria (EAZA).

History
Birmingham Zoo was opened on 1 May 1964 by the Dudley Zoological Society, within Cannon Hill Park. The site of the park was once part of a 16th-century fulling mill, known as Pebble Mill.

It was designed to exhibit mainly young animals, but it also housed Dudley Zoo's collection of monkeys and two dromedaries for rides.

Once described as a little gem of a zoo, it closed in 1973 for unknown reasons. It was reopened in 1974 by Birmingham City Council as the Birmingham Nature Centre. The centre and its entrance were originally part of the Birmingham Natural History Museum. In 2014 it was  rebranded as Birmingham Wildlife Conservation Park.

Earlier zoos
Birmingham has had a number of zoos over the years. The first was the Birmingham and Midlands Zoological Gardens in Balsall Heath, opened in 1873. The second was Aston Lower Grounds Menagerie in Aston, opened in 1880. The last was Birmingham Zoo, which opened in 1910 but closed in 1930. There was also said to be a travelling menagerie, named J. E. James's Menagerie.

Animals
The zoo features mainly small mammals. Its occupants include:

 A herd of Bagot goats
 Asian small-clawed otters
 Meerkats
 Lynxes
 Black-and-white ruffed lemur
 Ring-tailed lemur
 Mouse lemur
 Malagasy giant rat
 Golden-headed lion tamarin
 Goeldi's marmoset
 Squirrel monkey
 Pied tamarin
 Golden-headed lion tamarin
 Golden lion tamarin
 Ocelot
 African brush-tailed porcupine
 Red-necked wallaby
 Capybara
 Red squirrels
 Heritage breed farm animals
 Various owls
 Greater rhea
 Armadillo 
 Northern bald ibis
 Wattled crane
 Blue crane
 Reptiles
 Jamaican boa
 Komodo Dragon
 Insects
 Sloth
 Potto

Red pandas

The nature centre used to have a pair of male red pandas. However these have been re-housed as part of the national breeding programme. Ming Ming is visiting a female red panda in the Welsh Mountain Zoo.

Babu
Babu is a red panda who disappeared from the nature centre in November 2005 and spent four days on the loose before being discovered. Nature centre staff believe he was blown out of a tree and found himself outside his enclosure. His disappearance and the citywide panda hunt that ensued made national headlines. After being discovered by a dog-walker in Moseley, Babu was dramatically reunited with his brother Tensing live on Midlands Today.

Notes

External links

BBC "Red panda pair come out of hiding " 15 October 2003
Red Panda Breeding Program

Zoos in England
Wildlife Conservation Park
Nature centres in England
Buildings and structures in Birmingham, West Midlands
Zoos established in 1974